Gil Kenan (October 16, 1976) is a British–American film director, film producer, screenwriter, and animator.

Early life
Kenan was born in London to a Jewish family. When Kenan was three, his family immigrated to Tel Aviv, Israel. He has one brother. At age eight, Kenan and his family once again moved to Reseda, Los Angeles.

Kenan studied at the film division of the University of California, Los Angeles where he received a Master of Fine Arts degree in animation in 2002. For his graduate thesis, he created a 10-minute stop-motion/live-action short film, The Lark.

Career
The first public screening of The Lark caught the attention of Jordan Bealmear, who was an assistant at Creative Artists Agency. The agency sent hundreds of copies of Kenan's short in order to interest parties in the film industry and after a few months of interviews, Robert Zemeckis offered Kenan the director's chair for his first feature, Monster House (2006). Executive produced by Zemeckis and Steven Spielberg, it was nominated for an Academy Award for Best Animated Feature, but lost to Happy Feet.

Kenan followed Monster House with City of Ember, a post-apocalyptic science fiction adventure film based on Jeanne Duprau's 2003 novel of the same name. Produced by Tom Hanks, it was released in October 2008 to mixed reviews and poor box office results. Kenan's next film, Poltergeist, a remake of the 1982 Tobe Hooper film of the same name, was released in May 2015. In July of that same year, Kenan signed on to direct and co-write a film adaptation of the popular video game series Five Nights at Freddy's by Scott Cawthon, but later withdrew from the project. In 2019, Kenan co-wrote a script along with Jason Reitman for Ghostbusters: Afterlife, which was released in 2021. After the film's success, he and Reitman inked an overall deal with Sony Pictures Entertainment to develop more projects. He was later chosen to direct a sequel to Ghostbusters: Afterlife, in addition to returning as a producer and co-writer.

Themes, style and influences
Kenan has cited David Lynch, Richard Elfman, Lotte Reiniger, Zbigniew Rybczyński and Alfred Hitchcock as influences; he once met with Elfman. Among his favorite movies and short films, Kenan has listed Eraserhead, Forbidden Zone and Tango, as all three influenced Kenan's short The Lark. He first became aware of a director's own style while watching Terry Gilliam's Time Bandits and appreciated Gilliam's point of view as well as that of Steven Spielberg in his 1980s films, leading him to respect a film's craft and storytelling.

Personal life
In 2005, Kenan married Eliza Chaikin, who was an art director on City of Ember.

Filmography

References

External links 
 
 Interview

1976 births
Living people
American animated film directors
Horror film directors
Animators from California
Film directors from London
Film directors from Los Angeles
UCLA Film School alumni
People from Reseda, Los Angeles
British Jews
20th-century American Jews
Israeli Jews
21st-century American Jews